Euxoa choris is a moth of the family Noctuidae first described by Leon F. Harvey in 1876. It is found in North America from south-western Saskatchewan, central Alberta and south-central Yukon, south to New Mexico, Arizona and California.

The wingspan is 41–43 mm. Adults are on wing from June to August. There is one generation per year.

References

Euxoa
Moths of North America

Moths described in 1876
Taxa named by Leon F. Harvey